This is an alphabetical list of notable Canadian actors. Some may have dual nationalities, being born elsewhere.

A 

Graham Abbey
Alistair Abell
Alejandro Abellan
Raymond Ablack
Jared Abrahamson
Aaron Abrams
Rudwan Khalil Abubaker
Dalmar Abuzeid
Susan Aceron
Mark Acheson
Sharon Acker
Jean Adair
Shiraz Adam
Beverly Adams
Claire Adams
Evan Adams
Marty Adams
Patrick J. Adams
R. J. Adams
Lovell Adams-Gray
Michael Adamthwaite
Rebecca Addelman
Dayo Ade
Melyssa Ade
Oluniké Adeliyi
Neil Affleck
Arlen Aguayo-Stewart
Carmen Aguirre
Paul Ahmarani
Andrew Airlie
Daniela Akerblom
Jeremy Akerman
Malin Åkerman
Marc Akerstream
Philip Akin
Denis Akiyama 
Karina Aktouf
Fajer Al-Kaisi
Kathryn Alexandre
Toya Alexis
Aisha Alfa
Hrant Alianak
Harris Allan
Martha Allan
Maud Allan
Brittany Allen
Ricca Allen
Sarah Allen
Tanya Allen
Thom Allison
Sheldon Allman
James Allodi
David Alpay
Marnie Alton
Melissa Altro
Clyde Alves
Robbie Amell
Stephen Amell
Lara Amersey
Jessica Amlee
Ali Ammar
Prince Amponsah
Dana Andersen
Greg Anderson
Melissa Sue Anderson
Melody Anderson
Pamela Anderson
Shamier Anderson
Tori Anderson
Starr Andreeff
Thea Andrews
Gene Andrusco
Anne Anglin
Margaret Anglin
Kristi Angus
Paul Anka
Catherine Annau
Cameron Ansell
Zachary Ansley
Trey Anthony
Benz Antoine
Vinessa Antoine
Salvatore Antonio
Danny Antonucci
Magda Apanowicz
Natalie Appleton
Nicole Appleton
Manuel Aranguiz
Nicole Arbour
Steve Arbuckle
Denys Arcand
Gabriel Arcand
Nathaniel Arcand
Nico Archambault
Charles Arling
Aviva Armour-Ostroff
Brad Armstrong
Dean Armstrong
Tré Armstrong
François Arnaud
Will Arnett
Charlotte Arnold
Craig Arnold
Daniel Arnold
Lawrence Aronovitch
Sylvio Arriola
Nina Arsenault
Benjamin Arthur
Julia Arthur
Michelle Arvizu
Anthony Asbury
Lauren Ash
Angela Asher
Aaron Ashmore
Shawn Ashmore
Cynthia Ashperger
Ted Atherton
Harvey Atkin
Damien Atkins
David Atkinson
Robin Aubert
Charlotte Aubin
Dhanaé Audet-Beaulieu
Melissa Auf der Maur
Gerald Auger
Matt Austin
Teri Austin
Roger Avary
Marie Avgeropoulos
Dan Aykroyd
Peter Aykroyd
Kristian Ayre
Benjamin Ayres
Caroline Azar
Yank Azman

B 

Joanna Bacalso
Sebastian Bach
Steve Bacic
Clark Backo
Ali Rizvi Badshah
Bilal Baig
Julian Bailey
Paule Baillargeon
Bonar Bain
Conrad Bain
Jennifer Bain
Bob Bainborough
Scott Bairstow
Joby Baker
Simon R. Baker
Brigitte Bako
Liane Balaban
Rogelio Balagtas
Karen Dianne Baldwin
Lise Baldwin
Robert Baldwin
Liza Balkan
Ashleigh Ball
Linda Ballantyne
Ella Ballentine
Chasty Ballesteros
Heather Bambrick
James Bamford
Carl Banas
Cameron Bancroft
Andrea Bang
Diana Bang
Boyd Banks
Perry Banks
Sydney Banks
Margaret Bannerman
Shanice Banton
Sofia Banzhaf
Anaïs Barbeau-Lavalette
Gillian Barber
John Barbour
Amanda Barker
Jessica Barker
Emilie-Claire Barlow
Demore Barnes
Kathleen Barr
Sarah Barrable-Tishauer
Brent Barraclough
Katherine Barrell
Michel Barrette
Yvon Barrette
Alex Barris
Mabel Barrison
Claudja Barry
Lawrence Barry
Lilly Bartlam
Jay Baruchel
Gary Basaraba
Earl W. Bascom
Ben Bass
Keana Lyn Bastidas
Nick Bateman
David Bateson
Elise Bauman
Eric Bauza
Jennifer Baxter
Frances Bay
Adam Beach
Gerry Bean
Stephanie Beard
Rod Beattie
Nancy Beatty
Robert Beatty
Tanaya Beatty
Ben Beauchemin
Michelle Beaudoin
Christine Beaulieu
Bobby Becken
Henry Beckman
Steven Bednarski
Samantha Bee
Jennifer Beech
Christian Bégin
Bernard Behrens
Dan Beirne
Brendan Beiser
Walter Belasco
Lisa Ann Beley
Juliette Béliveau
Véronique Béliveau
Nour Belkhiria
Doron Bell
Jade C. Bell
Jill Belland
Marie-Hélène Bellavance
Rykko Bellemare
Kwena Bellemare-Boivin 
Ryan Belleville
Ray Bellew
Paul Bellini
Scott Bellis
Cynthia Belliveau
Gil Bellows
Marc Bendavid
Clé Bennett
Matthew Bennett
Sonja Bennett
Sophie Bennett
Zachary Bennett
Tyrone Benskin
Julia Benson
Shaun Benson
Lyriq Bent
Michael Benyaer
Françoise Berd
Annick Bergeron
Sheldon Bergstrom
Norm Berketa
Camille Bernard
Denis Bernard
Micheline Bernard
Michael Bernardo
Kevin Bernhardt
David Berni
Lisa Berry
Tamara Bernier Evans
Karen Bernstein
Dorothée Berryman
Attila Bertalan
Karen Bertelsen
Laura Bertram
William Bertram
Antoine Bertrand
Jocelyn Bérubé
Angela Besharah
Ardon Bess
Salome Bey
Raoul Bhaneja
Sonya Biddle
Cyril Biddulph
Émilie Bierre
Guy Big
Lani Billard
Emmanuel Bilodeau
Jean-Luc Bilodeau
Vincent Bilodeau
Luke Bilyk
Sahar Biniaz
Morris Birdyellowhead
Len Birman
Shaughnessy Bishop-Stall
Kirsten Bishopric
Thor Bishopric
Sandrine Bisson
Yannick Bisson
Joel Bissonnette
Catherine Black
Jully Black
Ryan Rajendra Black
Ian Blackwood
Bre Blair
Lionel Blair
Isabelle Blais
Peter Blais
Mervyn Blake
William Rufus Blake
Claude Blanchard
Rachel Blanchard
Neal Bledsoe
Alan Bleviss
Jason Blicker
Genevieve Blinn
Cherish Violet Blood
Ben Blue
Jack Blum
Trevor Blumas
Lothaire Bluteau
Domini Blythe
Bruce Boa
Daniela Bobadilla
Columpa Bobb
Hart Bochner
Lloyd Bochner
Robert Bockstael
Rick Bognar
Michael Boisvert
Katie Boland
James Bondy
Yolanda Bonnell
Céline Bonnier
Linwood Boomer
Nikohl Boosheri
Kristin Booth
Lindy Booth
Christa Borden
Walter Borden
Anne-Élisabeth Bossé
Réal Bossé
Devon Bostick
Sara Botsford
Jean-Guy Bouchard
Raymond Bouchard
Daniel Boucher
Jean-Carl Boucher
Nicole Bouma
Marie-Claude Bourbonnais
Hélène Bourgeois Leclerc
J. R. Bourne
David Boutin
Annie Bovaird
Geoffrey Bowes
Cory Bowles
Garen Boyajian
Lynda Boyd
John Boylan
Bernard Braden
Justin Bradley
Paul Bradley
Glenda Braganza
Tom Braidwood
Paula Brancati
Jock Brandis
André Brassard
Marie Brassard
Pierre Brassard
Paul-André Brasseur
Normand Brathwaite
Steve Braun
Paul Braunstein
Jay Brazeau
Peter Breck
John Bregar
Stéphane Breton
Beverley Breuer
Krista Bridges
Benoît Brière
Cameron Bright
Pierre-Luc Brillant
Yvette Brind'Amour
Christopher Britton
Ryder Britton
Dave Broadfoot
Cecil Broadhurst
Daniel Brochu
Evelyne Brochu
Sage Brocklebank
Leanna Brodie
Stefan Brogren
Valri Bromfield
Daniel Brooks
Danny Brooks
Elisabeth Brooks
Norman Brooks
Shelton Brooks
Claire Brosseau
Geneviève Brouillette
Robert Brouillette
J. Adam Brown
Aisha Brown
Charity Brown
Darrin Brown
Divine Brown
Don Brown
Jefferson Brown
Miquel Brown
Natalie Brown
Aurora Browne
D'Arcy Browning
Christine Brubaker
Dylan Bruce
Amanda Brugel
Robin Brûlé
Éric Bruneau
Laura Bruneau
Lucas Bryant
Greg Bryk
Michael Bublé
A. J. Buckley
Zoltán Buday
Barbara Budd
Genevieve Buechner
Joe Buffalo
Valerie Buhagiar
Geneviève Bujold
Evan Buliung
James Bulliard
Kylie Bunbury
Michael Burgess
Phil Burke
Samson Burke
Fulton Burley
Tom Burlinson
Alaina Burnett
Martha Burns
Raymond Burr
Jackie Burroughs
Janet Burston
Cindy Busby
Tom Busby
Howard Busgang
Arabella Bushnell
Pascale Bussières
Adam Butcher
Mandy Butcher
Dean Butler
Tom Butler
Brent Butt
George Buza
Steve Byers
Jim Byrnes

C 

Eric Cabral
Lally Cadeau
Anne-Marie Cadieux
Jason Cadieux
Sophie Cadieux
Inga Cadranel
Leah Cairns
Natasha Calis
Kay Callard
Jesse Camacho
Mark Camacho
Rod Cameron
Benedict Campbell
Chuck Campbell
Douglas Campbell
Conchita Campbell
Deragh Campbell
Neve Campbell
Nicholas Campbell
Paul Campbell
Jennifer Candy
John Candy
Sara Canning
Wanda Cannon
Patricia Cano
Yvan Canuel
Lorne Cardinal
Pierre-Yves Cardinal
Tantoo Cardinal
Len Cariou
Ben Carlson
Len Carlson
Leslie Carlson
Paul Carpenter
Jim Carrey
Luciana Carro
Jack Carson
Alex Carter 
Sarah Carter
Peggy Cartwright
Brent Carver
Dillon Casey
John Cassini
Tory Cassis 
France Castel
Aimée Castle
Maggie Castle
Marilyn Castonguay
Roch Castonguay
Anna Cathcart
Kim Cattrall
Lynne Cavanagh
Tom Cavanagh
Caroline Cave
Nicola Cavendish
Michael Cera
Erica Cerra
Catherine Chabot
Garry Chalk
Sarah Chalke
Munro Chambers
Andrée Champagne
Suzanne Champagne
Aimee Chan
Shannon Chan-Kent
Candy Chang
Keshia Chanté
Julia Chantrey
Alexander Chapman
Christine Chatelain
Anna Chatterton
Justin Chatwin
Osric Chau
Saara Chaudry
Maury Chaykin
Hannah Cheesman
Terry Chen
Évelyne de la Chenelière
Joyce Cheng
Olivia Cheng
Dmitry Chepovetsky
Jonas Chernick
Cayle Chernin
Jonathan Cherry
Richard Chevolleau
Charly Chiarelli
Gina Chiarelli
Frank Chiesurin
Juan Chioran
Louis Chirillo 
Mary-Colin Chisholm
Monia Chokri
Charlene Choi
Ins Choi
Tommy Chong
Rae Dawn Chong
Robbi Chong
Lara Jean Chorostecki
Billy Chow
Janet Chow
Lori Chow
Valerie Chow
Vivian Chow
Emmanuelle Chriqui
Hayden Christensen
Dinah Christie
Warren Christie
Eric Christmas
Babz Chula
Christy Chung
Linda Chung
Berton Churchill
Daniel Clark 
Jordan Clark
Robert Clark 
Susan Clark
Richard Clarkin
Helene Clarkson
Suzanne Clément
Sasha Clements
Glory Annen Clibbery
Karen Cliche
Robert Clothier
Fabien Cloutier
Suzanne Cloutier
William Cloutier
Conrad Coates
Kim Coates
Joe Cobden
Jim Codrington
Lisa Codrington
Michael Cohen 
Enrico Colantoni
Fabienne Colas
Keith Cole
Layne Coleman
Renée Coleman
John Colicos
Lynn Colliar
Frédérique Collin
Pierre Collin
Carla Collins
Dorothy Collins
James Collins
Lauren Collins
Patricia Collins
Richard Collins
Esteban Comilang
Tim Conlon
Nazneen Contractor
A. J. Cook
Ryan Cooley
Beverley Cooper
Jenny Cooper
Jon Cor 
Henry Corden
Amanda Cordner
Ian James Corlett
Jacinta Cormier
Marie-Andrée Corneille
Lisa Michelle Cornelius
Belinda Cornish
Penelope Corrin
Larissa Corriveau
Irlande Côté
Julianne Côté
Michel Côté
Ben Cotton
Clare Coulter
Alyson Court
Emily Coutts
Angèle Coutu
Jean Coutu
Christina Cox
Deborah Cox
Richard Ian Cox 
Susan Coyne
Georgia Craig
Kelly Craig
Michael Cram
Phyllis Crane
Matt Craven
Gavin Crawford
Mark Crawford
Rachel Crawford 
Michelle Creber
Jack Creley
Wendy Crewson
Amanda Crew
Mark Critch
Roark Critchlow
Jonathan Crombie
Neil Crone
Rachel Cronin
Hume Cronyn
Roger Cross
Josephine Crowell
Katie Crown 
Alex Crowther
Marie-Josée Croze
David Cubitt
Daniel Cudmore
Leah Renee Cudmore
Peter Cullen
Sean Cullen
Anna Cummer
Seán Cummings
Martin Cummins
Peter Cureton
Gordon Currie
Pierre Curzi
Elisha Cuthbert
Guillaume Cyr
Isabelle Cyr
Myriam Cyr
René Richard Cyr
Henry Czerny

D 

Cynthia Dale
Jennifer Dale
Nathan Dales
Normand D'Amour
Lawrence Dane
Tony Daniels
Roman Danylo
Diane D'Aquila
Dominic Darceuil
Agam Darshi
Jill Daum
Ellen David
Lolita Davidovich
Mackenzie Davis
Tanyalee Davis
William B. Davis
Tracy Dawson
Carol-Anne Day
Mark Day
Nicole de Boer
Yvonne De Carlo
Laura de Carteret
Catherine De Léan
Julian De Zotti
Lucy DeCoutere
Bénédicte Décary
Gerry Dee
Louis Del Grande
Maria del Mar
Jason Deline 
Marya Delver
Kris Demeanor
Stéphane Demers
Katherine DeMille
Romane Denis
Allegra Denton
Laysla De Oliveira
Miranda de Pencier
Kelly Depeault
John DeSantis 
Daniel DeSanto
Josée Deschênes
Michèle Deslauriers
Mélissa Désormeaux-Poulin
Trevor Devall
Paula Devicq
Colleen Dewhurst
Philip DeWilde
Caroline Dhavernas
Sébastien Dhavernas
Vekeana Dhillon
Domenic Di Rosa
Sergio Di Zio
Alex Diakun
Chris Diamantopoulos
Selma Diamond
Carlos Díaz
Liam Diaz
Steffi DiDomenicantonio
Lauren Diewold
Holly Dignard
Hugh Dillon
Eleonora Dimakos
Adam DiMarco
Melissa DiMarco
Joe Dinicol
Bruce Dinsmore 
Ma-Anne Dionisio
Catherine Disher
Anne Ditchburn
Dianne Doan
Nina Dobrev
Fefe Dobson
Heather Doerksen
Daniel Doheny
Lexa Doig
Xavier Dolan
Cindy Dolenc
Damon D'Oliveira
Nancy Dolman
Lesleh Donaldson
Peter Donaldson
Marc Donato 
James Doohan
Mike Dopud
Lévi Doré
Cory Doran
Brooke D'Orsay
Fifi D'Orsay
Anne Dorval
Aaron Douglas
Jeff Douglas 
Joanna Douglas
Shirley Douglas
Nathalie Doummar
Alisen Down
Nigel Downer
Brian Downey
Riele Downs
Aaryn Doyle 
John Drainie
Martin Drainville
Patricia Drake
Sylvie Drapeau
Marie Dressler
Spencer Drever
Patrick Drolet
Brian Drummond 
Kate Drummond
Laura Drummond
Julie du Page
Ellen Dubin
Leon Dubinsky
Martin Dubreuil
Deborah Duchêne
Cara Duff-MacCormick
Burkely Duffield
Victoria Duffield
Robin Duke
Douglass Dumbrille
Dawson Dunbar
Arlene Duncan
Barrie Dunn
Paul Dunn
Robin Dunne
Callum Dunphy
Rosemary Dunsmore
John Dunsworth
Molly Dunsworth
Sarah E. Dunsworth
Roy Dupuis
Erica Durance
Kevin Durand
Deanna Durbin
Peter Dvorsky
Karyn Dwyer

E 

Chris Earle
Edward Earle
Sam Earle
Katherine East
Jayne Eastwood
Maude Eburne
Matthew Edison
Sarah Edmondson
Harry Edwards
Atom Egoyan
Ali Eisner
David Eisner
Candace Elaine
Melissa Elias
Lawrence Elion
Beverley Elliott
Brennan Elliott
David James Elliott
Laurie Elliott
Lillian Elliott
Ephraim Ellis
Tracey Ellis
Mazin Elsadig
Ralph Endersby
Hannah Endicott-Douglas
Vivien Endicott-Douglas
Anke Engelke
Aryana Engineer
Jake Epstein
Josh Epstein
Kaj-Erik Eriksen
Rose-Maïté Erkoreka
Ennis Esmer
Mary Jo Eustace
Daniella Evangelista
Lini Evans
Dylan Everett
Erik Everhard
Jacob Ewaniuk 
Sophia Ewaniuk
Fred Ewanuick
Irdens Exantus

F 

Megan Fahlenbock
Meegwun Fairbrother
Kristin Fairlie
Elisabetta Fantone
Stacey Farber
Darrell Faria
Jillian Fargey
Gary Farmer
Shannon Farnon
Alexia Fast
Françoise Faucher
Angela Featherstone
Matreya Fedor
Tania Fédor
Brendan Fehr
Colm Feore
Colin Ferguson
Max Ferguson
Jodelle Ferland
Rodrigo Fernandez-Stoll
Charlene Fernetz
Claudia Ferri
Samantha Ferris
Danielle Fichaud
Nathan Fielder
Joy Fielding
Denise Filiatrault
Fab Filippo 
Nathan Fillion
Katie Findlay
Timothy Findley
Ken Finkleman
Carrie Finlay
Jennifer Finnigan
Christine Firkins
Brandon Firla
Rhiannon Fish
Noel Fisher
Catherine Fitch
Erin Fitzgerald
Diane Flacks
Erin Fleming
Brendan Fletcher
Page Fletcher
Sharry Flett
Hélène Florent
Waawaate Fobister
Dave Foley
Megan Follows
Ted Follows
Angela Fong
Glenn Ford
Luke Ford 
Melyssa Ford
Louise Forestier
Jenn Forgie
Rosemary Forsyth
Marianne Fortier
Dianne Foster
Lisa Foster
Carly Foulkes
Colin Fox
David Fox
Gavin Fox
Michael J. Fox
Andrew Francis
Jordan Francis
Stewart Francis
Don Francks
Rainbow Sun Francks
Jill Frappier
Brendan Fraser
Duncan Fraser
Danny Freedman
Jahmil French
Matt Frewer
Jonathan Frid
Brian Froud
Nolan Gerard Funk
Pier-Luc Funk
Nelly Furtado
Angela Fusco

G 

Richard Gabourie
Sarah Gadon
Lorena Gale
Vincent Gale
Brendan Gall
Patrick Gallagher
Étienne Galloy
Angela Galuppo
Robin Gammell
Nisha Ganatra
Monique Ganderton
Soo Garay
Hope Garber
Victor Garber
Saskia Garel
Krystal Garib
Pauline Garon
Mark Gatha
Kathleen Gati
Elise Gatien
Maxim Gaudette
Peter Kelly Gaudreault
Fran Gebhard
Jeff Geddis
Cara Gee
Éveline Gélinas
Gratien Gélinas
Mitsou Gélinas
Jasmin Geljo
Yani Gellman 
Chief Dan George
Kat Germain
Nicole Germain
Bruno Gerussi
Mark Ghanimé
Christine Ghawi
Leah Gibson
Martha Gibson
Sally Gifford
Marie Gignac
John Gilbert
Lucas Gilbertson
Onalea Gilbertson
Keir Gilchrist
Lara Gilchrist
Thea Gill
Charlie Gillespie
Daniel Gillies
Jennifer Gillis
Gail Gilmore
Patrick Gilmore
Jessalyn Gilsig
Nadia Giosia
Rémy Girard
Fernande Giroux
Michelle Giroux
Joanna Gleason
Edward Glen 
Stephen Kramer Glickman
Susan Glover
Grace Glowicki
Maurice Godin
Sarah Goldberg
Jake Goldsbie
Karine Gonthier-Hyndman
Patrice Goodman
Linda Goranson
Barbara Gordon
Joel Gordon
Eli Goree
Tamara Gorski
Ryan Gosling
Benoît Gouin
Mickaël Gouin
Glen Gould
Jen Gould
Nicolette Goulet
Robert Goulet
Luba Goy
Dakota Goyo
Aubrey Graham
Currie Graham
Sam Grana
Anais Granofsky
Sam De Grasse
Rachel Graton
Ona Grauer
Brittany Gray
Carsen Gray
Mackenzie Gray
Jason Gray-Stanford
Sabrina Grdevich
Dallas Green
George Green
Janet-Laine Green
Rick Green
Tom Green
Graham Greene
Lorne Greene
Bruce Greenwood
Kathy Greenwood 
Lyndie Greenwood
Douglas Grégoire
Yamie Grégoire
Macha Grenon
Sarah Grey
Katie Griffin
Lynne Griffin
Nonnie Griffin
Linda Griffiths
Shenae Grimes
Amy Groening
Marc-André Grondin
Hannah Gross
Paul Gross
David Paul Grove
Deborah Grover
Jesse Noah Gruman
Nicky Guadagni
Marie-Ginette Guay
Isabelle Guérard
Maude Guérin
Élise Guilbault
Luce Guilbeault
Paul Gury

H 

Benita Ha
Dayle Haddon
Kristen Hager
Garrick Hagon
Abby Hagyard
Medina Hahn
Corey Haim
Haji
Jennifer Hale
Jonathan Hale
Geri Hall
Monty Hall
Natalie Hall
Barbara Hamilton
Patricia Hamilton
Quancetia Hamilton
Emily Hampshire
Danielle Hampton
Kevin Hanchard
Elizabeth Hanna
Hamza Haq
Eve Harlow
Shalom Harlow
Jessica Harmon
Richard Harmon
Patricia Harras
Johanne Harrelle
Adam J. Harrington
Ashleigh Harrington
Barbara Eve Harris
Jonny Harris
Laura Harris
Don Harron
Phil Hartman
Ellie Harvie 
Susan Haskell
Ali Hassan
Jade Hassouné
Thomas Hauff
Allan Hawco
Terri Hawkes
Alana Hawley Purvis
Kay Hawtrey
Carter Hayden 
Lili Haydn
Jordan Hayes
David Hayter
Terra Hazelton
Dianne Heatherington
Dakota Ray Hebert
Meghan Heffern
Jayne Heitmeyer
Tricia Helfer
Anne Helm
John Hemphill
Dell Henderson
Meredith Henderson 
Saffron Henderson
Jacqueline Hennessy
Jill Hennessy
Kate Hennig
Martha Henry
Natasha Henstridge
Marieve Herington
Jimmy Herman 
Roland Hewgill 
Sitara Hewitt
David Hewlett
Christopher Heyerdahl
Tamara Hickey
Torri Higginson
Matt Hill 
Art Hindle
Darryl Hinds
Karen Hines
Patrick Hivon
Chelsea Hobbs
Edmund Hockridge
Michael Hogan
Susan Hogan
Arthur Holden 
Gina Holden
Laurie Holden
Kris Holden-Ried
Addison Holley
Lauren Holly
Adrian Holmes
Emily Holmes
Elinor Holt 
Sandrine Holt
Saba Homayoon
Elva Mai Hoover
Barclay Hope
Leslie Hope
Tamara Hope
William Hope
Paul Hopkins
Victoria Hopper
Kaniehtiio Horn
Christine Horne
Chelah Horsdal
Emanuel Hoss-Desmarais
Jeremy Hotz
Kenny Hotz
Germain Houde
Louis-José Houde
Alex House
Dakota House
Eric House
Cole Howard
Duane Howard
Kathleen Howard
Lisa Howard
Tracey Hoyt
Vicky Huang
Patrick Huard
Rhys Huber
Sébastien Huberdeau
Alaina Huffman
Kim Huffman
Jovanna Huguet
Kimberly Huie
Ross Hull
Luke Humphrey
Mark Humphrey
Emma Hunter
Juliette Huot
Walter Huston
William Hutt
Pascale Hutton
Pam Hyatt
Frances Hyland
James Hyndman

I 

L. Dean Ifill
Steve Ihnat
John Ioannou
John Ireland
Michael Ironside
Britt Irvin
Jennifer Irwin
May Irwin
Gérald Isaac
Katharine Isabelle
Nissae Isen 
Tajja Isen
Ayisha Issa
Johnny Issaluk
Robert Ito
Madeline Ivalu
Paul-Dylan Ivalu
Henriette Ivanans

J 

Joshua Jackson
Michael Jackson
Tom Jackson
Lou Jacobi
Kawennáhere Devery Jacobs
Christopher Jacot 
Chapelle Jaffe
Nicole Jaffe
Lisa Jakub
Sabrina Jalees
Stephan James
Alexane Jamieson
Joris Jarsky
Janyse Jaud
Anik Jean
Schelby Jean-Baptiste
Andrew Jenkins 
Rebecca Jenkins
Roy Jenson 
Connor Jessup
Robert Jezek
Suresh Joachim
Avan Jogia
Balinder Johal
Alexz Johnson
C. David Johnson
Clark Johnson
Eric Johnson
Marine Johnson
Matt Johnson
Taborah Johnson
Tyler Johnston
Roni Jonah
Andy Jones
Cathy Jones
G. B. Jones
Rick Jones 
Ronalda Jones
Tattiawna Jones
Laura Jordan
Victor Jory
Hélène Joy
Robert Joy
Demetrius Joyette
Akiel Julien

K 

Emmanuel Kabongo
Aliya Kanani
Stan Kane
John Kapelos
Ramin Karimloo
Athena Karkanis
Erin Karpluk
Sabine Karsenti
Sofia Karstens
Alex Karzis
Daniel Kash
Linda Kash
Daphna Kastner
Peter Kastner
Stana Katic
Judah Katz
David Kaye 
Marlon Kazadi
Kerrie Keane
Ruby Keeler
Eric Keenleyside
Tina Keeper
Jared Keeso 
Peter Kelamis 
Peter Keleghan
Joanne Kelly
Justin Kelly
Morgan Kelly
Terence Kelly
Kate Kelton
Cameron Kennedy
Jessica Parker Kennedy
Barbara Kent
Susan Kent
Roxanne Kernohan
Steven Kerzner
Martin Kevan
Armeena Khan
Julie Khaner
Arsinée Khanjian
Janet Kidder
Margot Kidder
Gail Kim
Deborah Kimmett
Dani Kind
Charmion King
Helen King
Dylan Kingwell
Shane Kippel
Luke Kirby
Mia Kirshner
Taylor Kitsch
Diego Klattenhoff
Joey Klein
Pom Klementieff
Tom Kneebone
Keith Knight 
Matthew Knight
Ann Knox
Erik Knudsen
Mpho Koaho
Sarah Kolasky
Shannon Kook
Asivak Koostachin
Tinsel Korey
Adam Korson
Corrine Koslo
Elias Koteas
Hattie Kragten
Isaac Kragten
Greg Kramer
Anthony Kramreither 
Kristin Kreuk
Natalie Krill
Kelly Kruger
Akshay Kumar
Grace Lynn Kung
Andrew Kushnir
Mimi Kuzyk
Paloma Kwiatkowski
Miranda Kwok
Sonija Kwok

L 

Rosa Labordé
John Labow
Léane Labrèche-Dor
Sarah-Jeanne Labrosse
Raphaël Lacaille
Andrée Lachapelle
Lisa LaCroix
Simon Lacroix
Sarah Lafleur
Whitney Lafleur
Jacinthe Laguë
Christie Laing
Jon Lajoie
Amy Lalonde
Maurice LaMarche
Anna Lambe
Guillaume Lambert
Lisa Lambert
Heath Lamberts
Tina Lameman
Willie Lamothe
Micheline Lanctôt
Alexandre Landry
Lisa Langlois
Margaret Langrick
Murray Langston
Robert Lantos
Denis Lapalme
Steve Laplante
Jean Lapointe
Stéphanie Lapointe
Pauline Lapointe
Kathleen Laskey
Sarah Lassez
Alexandrine Latendresse
Michelle Latimer
Carina Lau
Carole Laure
Charlotte Laurier
Lucie Laurier
Christian Laurin
Jani Lauzon
Jesse LaVercombe
Avril Lavigne
Barbara Law
Florence Lawrence
Carole Lazare
Michael Lazarovitch
Gabrielle Lazure
Charlotte Le Bon
Julie Le Breton
Maxime Le Flaguais
Véronique Le Flaguais
Marie-Christine Lê-Huu
Nicholas Lea
Ron Lea
Jennifer Leak
Walter Learning
Chris Leavins
Diana Leblanc
Karen LeBlanc
Laurence Leboeuf
Brittany LeBorgne
Vincent Leclerc
Antoine L'Écuyer
Guy L'Écuyer
Jean-Simon Leduc
Cory Lee
Cosette Lee
Louise Lee
Paul Sun-Hyung Lee
Ruta Lee
Sook-Yin Lee
Rachelle Lefevre
Ashley Leggat
Kristin Lehman
Carla Lehmann
Isaiah Lehtinen
Melanie Leishman
Tyron Leitso
Guillaume Lemay-Thivierge
Kris Lemche
Jasmine Lemée
Julie Lemieux 
Anthony Lemke
Vanessa Lengies
Sylvia Lennick
Sylvie Léonard
Marie-Évelyne Lessard
Anne Létourneau
François Létourneau
Elyse Levesque
Jenny Levine
Caissie Levy
Dan Levy
Eugene Levy
Sarah Levy
Shawn Levy
David Lewis
Holly Lewis
Phillip Lewitski
Monique Leyrac
Robin L'Houmeau
Leanne Li
Andrea Libman
Landon Liboiron
Rebecca Liddiard
Ali Liebert
Cody Lightning
Crystle Lightning
Georgina Lightning
Marilyn Lightstone
Beatrice Lillie
Evangeline Lilly
Sarah Lind
Cec Linder
Hardee T. Lineham
Jaclyn Linetsky 
Art Linkletter
Natalie Lisinska
Mark Little
Pauline Little
Rich Little
Nadia Litz
Bernice Liu
Simu Liu
Suzanne Lloyd
Hollie Lo
Mike Lobel
Hannah Lochner
Gene Lockhart
Anne Marie Loder
Fiona Loewi
Donal Logue
Éléonore Loiselle
Celine Lomez
Sophie Lorain
Kayla Lorette
Kevin Loring
Alison Louder
Crystal Lowe
Jessica Lowndes
Yvette Lu
Jessica Lucas
Michela Luci
Ieva Lucs
Alexander Ludwig
Linlyn Lue
Marla Lukofsky
Jeff Lumby 
Steve Lund
Tabitha Lupien
Emmanuelle Lussier-Martinez
Erica Luttrell
Rachel Luttrell
Heidi Lynch
Kate Lynch
Debbie Lynch-White

M 

Allie MacDonald
Ann-Marie MacDonald
Austin MacDonald
Mike MacDonald
Norm Macdonald
Shauna MacDonald
Lee MacDougall
Christie MacFadyen
Luke Macfarlane
Martha MacIsaac
Mylène Mackay
Bhreagh MacNeil
Laine MacNeil
Peter MacNeill
Melanie Morse MacQuarrie
Adriana Maggs
Michèle Magny
Gilles Maheu
Anita Majumdar
Shaun Majumder
Chris Makepeace
Jonathan Malen
Keram Malicki-Sanchez 
Jane Mallett
Fanny Mallette
Greg Malone
Barbara Mamabolo 
Howie Mandel
Michael Mando
Rizwan Manji
Andrea Mann
David Manners
Sarah Manninen
Bronwen Mantel
Cheri Maracle
Patricia Marceau
Barbara March
Mara Marini
Gabrielle Marion-Rivard
Brian Markinson
Louise Marleau
Marie-Noelle Marquis
Alan Marriott 
Kristie Marsden
Amber Marshall
Ruth Marshall
Alexis Martin
Andrea Martin
Anne-Marie Martin
Chris William Martin
Flora Martínez
Jorge Martinez Colorado
Daniel Maslany
Tatiana Maslany
Raymond Massey
Jean-Pierre Masson
Mena Massoud
Pat Mastroianni
Diego Matamoros
Kari Matchett
Anik Matern
Suleka Mathew
Erin Mathews
Hrothgar Mathews
Cameron Mathison
Sharron Matthews
Trevor Matthews
Amy Matysio
Gail Maurice
Blake Mawson
Lois Maxwell
Paul Maxwell
Roberta Maxwell
Alberta Mayne
Tawiah M'carthy
Rachel McAdams
Bryn McAuley 
Maxwell McCabe-Lokos
Tom McCamus
Sean McCann
Jay McCarrol
Emilia McCarthy
Nobu McCarthy
Sheila McCarthy
Steven McCarthy
Kandyse McClure
Scott McCord 
Eric McCormack
Kelly McCormack
Bruce McCulloch
Dean McDermott
Kevin McDonald
Miriam McDonald
Ryan McDonald
Heather McEwen
Meredith McGeachie
Paul McGillion
Benoît McGinnis
James McGowan
Debra McGrath
Doug McGrath
Jane McGregor
Stacey McGunnigle
Terry McGurrin 
Stephen McHattie
Yanna McIntosh
Melissa McIntyre
Johanne McKay
Don McKellar
Patrick McKenna
Seana McKenna
Patricia McKenzie
Britt McKillip
Carly McKillip
Sammy McKim
Mark McKinney
Casey McKinnon
Megan McKinnon
Brandon Jay McLaren
Hollis McLaren
Aloka McLean
Mike McLeod
Shelagh McLeod
Allyn Ann McLerie
Michael McManus
Richard McMillan
Mercedes McNab
Scott McNeil
Kevin McNulty
Andy McQueen
Sarah McVie
Caitlynne Medrek
Mark Meer
Isabelle Mejias
André Melançon
Wendel Meldrum
Andrea Menard
Julie Ménard
Lysandre Ménard
Gerry Mendicino
Araya Mengesha
Laura Mennell
Evan Mercer
Rick Mercer
Monique Mercure
Melanie Merkosky
Belinda Metz
Kelly Metzger
Brendan Meyer 
Michelle Meyrink
Darcy Michael
Dominique Michel
Lorne Michaels
Manon Miclette
Leyla Milani
Albert Millaire 
Andrew Miller
Gabrielle Miller
Jennifer Miller
Monique Miller
Peter Miller
Sherry Miller
Deanna Milligan
Dustin Milligan
Alan Mills 
Pat Mills
Stephanie Anne Mills
Marc Minardi 
Claudette Mink
Beau Mirchoff
Stacie Mistysyn
Atticus Mitchell
Shay Mitchell
Colin Mochrie
Melissa Molinaro
Michelle Molineux
Steven Cree Molison
Merwin Mondesir
Cory Monteith
Belinda Montgomery
Pascale Montpetit
Sara Montpetit
Andrew Moodie
Tanya Moodie
Peter Mooney
Ashleigh Aston Moore
Frank Moore
Stephanie Moore
Tedde Moore
Tracey Moore
Alice Moran
Rick Moranis
Sylvie Moreau
Denise Morelle
Alice Morel-Michaud
Michelle Morgan
Vanessa Morgan
Wesley Morgan 
Stephanie Morgenstern
Ishan Morris
Alanis Morissette
Louis Morissette
Libby Morris
Kirby Morrow 
Max Morrow
Rakhee Morzaria
Carrie-Anne Moss
Jesse Moss
Tegan Moss
Joseph Motiki
Kate Moyer
Masasa Moyo
Thamela Mpumlwana
Al Mukadam
Nicole Muñoz
Lochlyn Munro
Neil Munro
Samantha Munro
Gage Munroe 
Kathleen Munroe
Lachlan Murdoch
Bjanka Murgel
Annie Murphy
Dwain Murphy
Mathew Murray
Sunday Muse
Mike Myers
Lubomir Mykytiuk
Michelle Mylett

N 

Alexandre Nachi
Rupinder Nagra
Tony Nappo
Tony Nardi
Robert Naylor
Dylan Neal
Carrie-Lynn Neales
Louis Negin
Natasha Negovanlis
Reagan Dale Neis
Isabelle Nélisse
Sophie Nélisse
Kate Nelligan
Drew Nelson
Violet Nelson
Caroline Néron
Émilien Néron
John Neville
Brooke Nevin
Jacques Newashish
Richard Newman
Alisha Newton
Mayko Nguyen
Nguyen Thanh Tri
Melanie Nicholls-King
Leslie Nielsen
Jesse Nilsson 
Andre Noble
Eleanor Noble
Michelle Nolden
Patricia Nolin
Julie Nolke
Marilyn Norry
Rebecca Northan
Paul Nutarariaq
Diane Nyland

O 

Brandon Oakes
Annick Obonsawin
Aliyah O'Brien
Brenna O'Brien
Mark O'Brien
Clairette Oddera
Deborah Odell
Joshua Odjick
Noémie O'Farrell
Steven Ogg
Sandra Oh
Catherine O'Hara
Sonja O'Hara
Enuka Okuma
Thomas Antony Olajide
Peter Oldring 
Britne Oldford
Craig Olejnik
Huguette Oligny
Nicole Oliver
America Olivo
Taylor Olson
Ty Olsson 
Melissa O'Neil
Sean O'Neill
Michael Ontkean
Ndidi Onukwulu
Anne Openshaw
Joan Orenstein
Corinne Orr
Marina Orsini
Meghan Ory
Paul O'Sullivan 
Vincent-Guillaume Otis
Joel Oulette
Peter Outerbridge
Rabah Aït Ouyahia
Chris Owens
Patricia Owens
Alex Ozerov

P 

David Paetkau
Elliot Page
Mahée Paiement
Christine Pak
David Palffy
Candy Palmater
Zoie Palmer
Melanie Papalia
François Papineau
Stéphane Paquette
Anna Paquin
Jivesh Parasram
Frédérique Paré
Jessica Paré
Kevin Parent
Caroline Park
Grace Park
Megan Park
Cecilia Parker
Leni Parker
Molly Parker
Gerard Parkes 
Barbara Parkins
Anie Pascale
Reagan Pasternak
Ellora Patnaik
Dorothy Patrick
Merritt Patterson
Shirley Patterson
Aislinn Paul
Aleks Paunovic
Alex Paxton-Beesley
Dan Payne
Nelofer Pazira
Lucy Peacock
Valerie Pearson
Krystin Pellerin
Théodore Pellerin
Andrée Pelletier
Bronson Pelletier
Denise Pelletier
Wilma Pelly
Madeleine Péloquin
Chanelle Peloso
Sladen Peltier
Tahmoh Penikett
Rosalie Pépin
Barry Pepper
Missy Peregrym
Emily Perkins
Charles Antoine Perreault
Rose-Marie Perreault
Justin Peroff 
Matthew Perry
Xavier Petermann
Russell Peters
David Petersen
Luvia Petersen
Eric Peterson
Shelley Peterson
Doris Petrie
Dan Petronijevic
Joanna Pettet
Stefanie von Pfetten
Anastasia Phillips
Autumn Phillips
Kathleen Phillips
Patricia Phillips
Andrew Phung
Béatrice Picard
Henri Picard
Luc Picard
Lottie Pickford
Mary Pickford
Walter Pidgeon
Joseph Pierre
Shailyn Pierre-Dixon
Andrew Pifko
Cara Pifko
Sebastian Pigott
Alison Pill
Jacqueline Pillon
Antoine Pilon
Antoine Olivier Pilon
Daniel Pilon
Donald Pilon
Claire Pimparé
Joe Pingue
Arnold Pinnock 
Gordon Pinsent
Leah Pinsent
Roddy Piper
Tommie-Amber Pirie
Jennifer Pisana
Louise Pitre
Erin Pitt
Annabella Piugattuk
Mandy Playdon
Christopher Plummer
Jennifer Podemski
Tamara Podemski
Kim Poirier
Sarah Polley
Alexander Pollock
Sharon Pollock
Léa Pool
Aaron Poole
Carly Pope
Paul Popowich
Louise Portal
MacKenzie Porter
Ellie Posadas
Christian Potenza 
Chris Potter
Brigitte Poupart
Nicole Power
Paul David Power
Sarah Power
Victoria Pratt
Cynthia Preston
Marie Prevost
Connor Price
Jason Priestley
Ramona Pringle
Jenn Proske
Brooklynn Proulx
Danielle Proulx
Émile Proulx-Cloutier
Kirsten Prout
Karl Pruner

Q 

David Qamaniq
John Qualen
Iain Quarrier
Chantal Quesnel
Alexandra Quinn
William Quinn

R 

Pamela Rabe
Paul Rabliauskas
Rosemary Radcliffe
Barbara Radecki
Natalie Radford
Douglas Rain
Christopher Ralph 
Nabil Rajo
Maitreyi Ramakrishnan
Gord Rand
Claire Rankin
Jeremy Ratchford
Meaghan Rath
Benjamin Ratner
Lisa Ray
Jennie Raymond
Aaron Read
Barbara Read
David Reale
John Reardon
Duke Redbird
Dan Redican
Sarah-Jane Redmond
Keanu Reeves
Laura Regan
Tanja Reichert
Adam Reid 
Fiona Reid
Kate Reid
Noah Reid 
Georgina Reilly
Gary Reineke
Winston Rekert
Mark Rendall 
Callum Keith Rennie
Colleen Rennison
Ginette Reno
Liisa Repo-Martell
Jodie Resther 
Gloria Reuben
Michael Reventar
Jillian Reynolds
Ryan Reynolds
Caroline Rhea
Donnelly Rhodes
Sébastien Ricard
Italia Ricci
Nahéma Ricci
Alex Rice
Billie Mae Richards
Jasmine Richards
Jackie Richardson
Isabel Richer
Julian Richings
Emily Bett Rickards
Cara Ricketts
Kyle Rideout
Michael Riley
Juno Rinaldi
Maya Ritter
Patrick Roach
Ryan Robbins
Michael Roberds 
Denise Robert
Rick Roberts
Shawn Roberts
Françoise Robertson
Jennifer Robertson
Kathleen Robertson
Nancy Robertson
Louise Robey
Joakim Robillard
Toby Robins
Karen Robinson
Pierrette Robitaille
Wayne Robson
Debbie Rochon
Seth Rogen
Michael Rogers
Kacey Rohl
Sasha Roiz
Susan Roman
Évelyne Rompré
Bobby Roode
Cristina Rosato
Tony Rosato
Gabrielle Rose
Evany Rosen
Michelle Rossignol
Carlo Rota
Andrea Roth
Teryl Rothery
Anna Mae Routledge
Jean-Louis Roux
Kelly Rowan
Ronnie Rowe
Melissa Roxburgh
Anusree Roy
Maxim Roy
Lilou Roy-Lanouette
Allan Royal 
Tim Rozon
Jan Rubeš
Susan Douglas Rubeš
Les Rubie
Ron Rubin 
Saul Rubinek
Michael Rudder
Francine Ruel
Adamo Ruggiero
Kurt Max Runte
Craig Russell
Ann Rutherford
Rusty Ryan
Tracy Ryan
Lisa Ryder

S 

Marcel Sabourin
Vik Sahay
Ed Sahely
Jason St. Amour
Tabitha St. Germain
Michelle St. John 
Hugo St-Cyr
Buffy Sainte Marie
Chloé Sainte-Marie
Catherine St-Laurent
Nancy Anne Sakovich
Rosa Salazar
Sonya Salomaa
Ève Salvail
Eliza Sam
Cindy Sampson
Tony Sampson
Victoria Sanchez
Ecstasia Sanders
Garwin Sanford
Zak Santiago
Riza Santos
Will Sasso
Tania Saulnier
Tyrone Savage 
Leela Savasta
Paul Savoie
Devon Sawa
Joe Sawyer
Michele Scarabelli
Alan Scarfe
Jonathan Scarfe
Joe Scarpellino
August Schellenberg
Christina Schild
Talia Schlanger
Kyle Schmid
Christina Schmidt
Geneviève Schmidt
Monika Schnarre
Aliocha Schneider
Émile Schneider
Tom Scholte
Lisa Schrage
Kim Schraner
Emmanuel Schwartz
Albert Schultz
Eric Schweig
Caterina Scorsone
Camilla Scott
Melanie Scrofano
Alison Sealy-Smith
Michael Seater
Noot Seear
Sagine Sémajuste
Elena Semikina
Nick Serino
Corey Sevier
Tommy Sexton
Jeff Seymour
Zaib Shaikh
Kerry Shale
Chuck Shamata
Melinda Shankar 
Michael Shanks
Polly Shannon
Rekha Sharma
William Shatner
Helen Shaver
Athole Shearer
Norma Shearer
Anthony Sherwood
Gale Sherwood
Madeleine Sherwood
Erin Shields
Anthony Shim
Joanna Shimkus
Sofia Shinas
Aidan Shipley 
Nell Shipman
Catherine Shirriff
Martin Short
Gilbert Sicotte
Kris Siddiqi
Sandy Sidhu
Anna Silk
Carmen Silvera
Jay Silverheels
Robert A. Silverman
Chelan Simmons
Shadia Simmons
Hannah Simone
Denis Simpson
Karen Simpson
Marc Singer
Shawn Singleton
Lilly Singh
Pamela Mala Sinha
Rachel Skarsten
Tiera Skovbye
Amy Sloan
Alexis Smith
Douglas Smith
Gregory Smith
Jaclyn A. Smith
Kavan Smith
Lauren Lee Smith
Makyla Smith
Mike Smith
Robert Smith
Steve Smith
Trevor Smith
Sonja Smits
Cobie Smulders
Sarah Smyth
Naomi Snieckus
Victoria Snow
Paul Soles
Ksenia Solo
Christine Solomon
Brett Somers
Steph Song
Manoj Sood
Linda Sorenson
Linda Sorgini
Ned Sparks
Monique Spaziani
Scott Speedman
Jennifer Spence
Peter Spence
Sebastian Spence
Tara Spencer-Nairn
Tracy Spiridakos
Ruth Springford
Brent Stait
Jewel Staite
Nicole Stamp
Maruska Stankova
John Stark
Bernard Starlight
Muriel Starr
Peter Stebbings
Cassie Steele
Jessica Steen
Rob Stefaniuk 
Tabitha St. Germain
David Steinberg
Janaya Stephens
Amanda Stepto
Robyn Stevan
Diane Stevenett
Cynthia Stevenson
Alexandra Stewart
Catherine Mary Stewart
Julie Stewart
Rob Stewart
Tyler Stewart
Nicole Stoffman
Clare Stone
Stuart Stone
Waneta Storms
Chantal Strand
Sarah Strange
Dorothy Stratten
Tara Strong
Katie Stuart
Camille Sullivan
Charlotte Sullivan
Sean Sullivan
Cree Summer
Roseanne Supernault
Rajiv Surendra
David Sutcliffe
Donald Sutherland
Kiefer Sutherland
Rossif Sutherland
Janine Sutto
Serinda Swan
Suresh Joachim
Michelle Sweeney

T 

Eva Tanguay
Chase Tang
Amanda Tapping
Toby Tarnow
Dino Tavarone
Carolyn Taylor
Mark Taylor
Sharon Taylor
Tamara Taylor
Emma Taylor-Isherwood
Sally Taylor-Isherwood
Jill Teed
April Telek
Tasya Teles
Emily Tennant
Venus Terzo
Madison Tevlin
Guy Thauvette
Deborah Theaker
Marie-Jo Thério
Michael Therriault
Anthony Therrien
Olivette Thibault
Alan Thicke
Dave Thomas
Greg Thomey
Hugh Thompson
Jody Thompson
Marni Thompson
Reece Thompson
Scott Thompson
Shelley Thompson
Kristen Thomson
R.H. Thomson
Alicia Thorgrimsson
Alison Thornton
Pat Thornton
Linda Thorson
Michelle Thrush
Dov Tiefenbach
Jacob Tierney
Marie Tifo
Sara Tilley
Jennifer Tilly
Meg Tilly
Cali Timmins
Kendra Timmins
Robert Tinkler 
Brittany Tiplady
Lee Tockar 
Kate Todd
Jordan Todosey
Vincent Tong
Gordon Tootoosis
Sara Topham
Max Topplin
Sarah Torgov
Ingrid Torrance
Jackie Torrens
Jonathan Torrens
Elias Toufexis
Theresa Tova
Ian Tracey
Keegan Connor Tracy
Sophie Traub
Richard Travers
Victor Andrés Trelles Turgeon
Amaryllis Tremblay
Emma Tremblay
Fannie Tremblay
Gabrielle Tremblay
Ghyslain Tremblay
Guylaine Tremblay
Jacob Tremblay
Johanne-Marie Tremblay
John Paul Tremblay
Karelle Tremblay
Kay Tremblay
Larry Tremblay
Louriza Tronco
Kate Trotter
Catherine Trudeau
Margaret Trudeau
Yanic Truesdale
James Tupper
Carla Turcotte
Kristopher Turner
Kett Turton
Shannon Tweed
Terry Tweed
Tracy Tweed
Jud Tylor
Barbara Tyson

U

Natar Ungalaaq
Deborah Kara Unger
Mia Uyeda

V 

Arnaud Vachon
Sonia Vachon
Maria Vacratsis
Billy Van
Karine Vanasse
Alan van Sprang
Emily VanCamp
Darla Vandenbossche
Laura Vandervoort
Vanity
Joanne Vannicola
Nia Vardalos
Sugith Varughese
Tasha de Vasconcelos
Emmanuelle Vaugier
Nadine Van der Velde
Aliza Vellani
Ingrid Veninger
John Vernon
Kate Vernon
Jean-Nicolas Verreault
Kevin Vidal
Asia Vieira
Sonia Vigneault
Sam Vincent
Angela Vint
Katya Virshilas
Perrie Voss
Julia Voth
Vlasta Vrána

W 

Michael Wade
Rufus Wainwright
Susan Walden
May Waldron
Andrew Walker
Bill Walker
Craig Walker
Max Walker
Amanda Walsh
Arthur Walsh
Gwynyth Walsh
Mary Walsh
Alisa Walton
Douglas Walton
Jessalyn Wanlim
Dave Ward 
Lyman Ward
Ryan Ward
Zack Ward
Graham Wardle
Estella Warren
Dora Wasserman
Morgan Waters
Martin Watier
Alberta Watson
Benjamin Charles Watson
Jeffrey Watson
Jim Watson
Jonathan Watton
Bahia Watson
Lucile Watson
Matt Watts
Richard Waugh
Al Waxman
Aaron Webber
Timothy Webber
Hugh Webster
Torri Webster
Victor Webster
Lisa Wegner
Danny Wells
Matt Wells
Robb Wells
Jonathan Welsh
Kenneth Welsh
Cathy Weseluck 
Chandra West
Murray Westgate
Diana Weston
Steve Weston
Jack Wetherall
Jennifer Whalen
John White
Marjorie White
Percy Hynes White
Ron White
Sherry White
Jacob Whiteduck-Lavoie
Jonathan Whitesell
Elizabeth Whitmere
Connor Widdows
Cainan Wiebe
Randall Wiebe
Chris Wiggins
Mary Charlotte Wilcox
John Wildman
Peter Wildman
Colm Wilkinson
Gina Wilkinson
Christine Willes
Chad Willett
David William
Barbara Williams
Don S. Williams
Evan Williams
Genelle Williams
Harland Williams
Marshall Williams
Max Williams
Nigel Shawn Williams
Rebecca Williams
Siobhan Williams
Tonya Lee Williams
Wes Williams
Bree Williamson
Kirsten Williamson
Austin Willis 
Leueen Willoughby
Mike Wilmot
Linda Wilscam
Blythe Wilson
Dale Wilson
Jonathan Wilson
K. Trevor Wilson
Marie Wilson
Niamh Wilson
Rachel Wilson
Jeff Wincott
Michael Wincott
Katheryn Winnick
Kathryn Winslow
Maurice Dean Wint
Robert Wisden
Joseph Wiseman
Stefan Wodoslawsky
Jayli Wolf
Mariloup Wolfe
Finn Wolfhard
Dominika Wolski
Ellen Wong
Jadyn Wong
Grahame Wood
Jacqueline MacInnes Wood
Donald Woods
Mark Kenneth Woods
Fred Woodward
Eric Woolfe
Édouard Woolley
Gordon Michael Woolvett
Jaimz Woolvett
Marc Worden
Calum Worthy
Supinder Wraich
Fay Wray
Catherine Wreford
Alexsandra Wright
Janet Wright
Nicolas Wright
Susan Wright
Tracy Wright
Cynthia Wu-Maheux

Y 

Lisa Yamanaka
Marline Yan
Scott Yaphe
Michael Yarmush
Kim Yaroshevskaya
Benny Yau
Richard Yearwood
David Yee
Sally Yeh
Norman Yeung
Françoise Yip
Jean Yoon
Tyler York
Aden Young
Alan Young
D'bi Young
Jonathon Young
Noreen Young
Stephen Young
Trudy Young
Andrew Younghusband
Hannan Younis
Raugi Yu
Catalina Yue

Z 

Mary Lu Zahalan
Alex Zahara
Dominic Zamprogna
Gema Zamprogna
Lenore Zann
Chiara Zanni
Sylvia Zaradic
Natty Zavitz
Pete Zedlacher
Emmanuelle Zeesman
Kevin Zegers
Michael Zelniker
Kathryn Zenna
Patricia Zentilli
Matt Zimmerman
Tanner Zipchen
Julie Zwillich
Noam Zylberman

See also

List of Canadians
Lists of actors

References